Chenoy's is a Jewish delicatessen and restaurant that first opened in Montreal, Quebec, in 1936. Its original claim to fame was offering the Montreal-style smoked meat sandwich. Chenoy's first opened in the old Jewish neighbourhood on the Main, close to Rue Marie-Anne. The oldest remaining Chenoy's deli is in Dollard-des-Ormeaux opened in 1974 by Morty Chenoy and brothers Nick and Costa Sigounis.

History
Like other great Montreal delis (Schwartz's, Dunn's), Chenoy's first opened in the old Jewish neighbourhood on the Main (Saint Laurent Boulevard), close to Rue Marie-Anne. As times changed, the deli would move and be franchised. From Chenoy's history:

"...in 1936 we lost the key...

The original (4) "Chenoy Boys" had been doing Deli right since 1936. Our story starts in a small local of St.Laurent Boulevard... now over 75 years later we're still turning out our Famous Smoked-Meat from all areas of the city!

Their specialty was Smoked-Meat, but the new owners haven’t stopped at that!... from bacon & eggs, to filet mignon.... Chenoys is the place to grab a bite for whatever you might like.

The only problem is in 1936 we lost the key... so we’ve been working 25 Hrs a day, 365 days a year ever since to serve you!

The illustration on the cover depicts the original location of Deli Chenoys in 1936, then located on St. Laurent Boulevard, near Marianne Street. From its humble origins to modern times, our success has gone through several decades and generations, but one thing has remained the same...."

Chenoy's would later franchise delis, in 
Lasalle, Quebec, at 7660 Newman Boulevad; in Brossard, on Taschereau Boulevard; and in Chomedey, in Laval, on Boulevard Curé-Labelle, have closed since 2017. The last family member to be an owner was the late Mortimer (Morty) Chenoy.

A Chenoy's franchise opened in Gatineau in 1997 on Boulevard de l'Hôpital, in Complexe Lumière (aka "Cinema 9"). It was closed in 2019 and rebranded as part of the Nickels deli chain.

Restaurants

The oldest remaining Chenoy's deli is in Dollard-des-Ormeaux, on Boulevard Saint-Jean, which opened in 1974 by Morty Chenoy and brothers Nick and Costa Sigounis.

Morty sold his half of the business back to the Sigounis family in the mid-1980s. Not long afterward, he was diagnosed with Alzheimer's disease. Morty passed away on January 22,1999.

In 2015 the restaurant building was put up or sale, but the Sigounis family has stated that it plans to keep the landmark deli in the West Island. As of 2020, it is the only Chenoys remaining in operation. The building in Chomedey on Quebec Route 117 no longer exists.

See also

 List of delicatessens

References

1936 establishments in Quebec
Ashkenazi Jewish culture in Montreal
Jewish delicatessens in Canada
Jews and Judaism in Montreal
Montreal cuisine
Restaurant chains in Canada
Restaurants established in 1936
Restaurants in Montreal